Timothy Johnson (born January 29, 1965) is the senior pastor at Orlando World Outreach Center in Orlando, Florida and a former professional American football defensive lineman in the National Football League (NFL).

College career
A standout defensive lineman at Penn State  from 1983 to 1986, Johnson was named an All-American in 1986, racking up 33 tackles and 5 sacks. He was a key member of the Nittany Lions' 1986 National Championship team.

He earned a Bachelor of Arts in liberal arts from Penn State in 1987.

Professional career
The 6-foot 3-inch, 260-pound Johnson was selected by the Pittsburgh Steelers in the sixth round (#141 overall) of the 1987 NFL Draft, where he played for three seasons. In five seasons with the Washington Redskins, Johnson played on the 1991 World Championship team, earning a Super Bowl ring in Super Bowl XXVI. In 1992 he was selected to the Pro Bowl, and the following year he was elected the 1993 Redskin of the year.

Ministry
In 1992, Johnson joined with former Redskin teammates Art Monk, Charles Mann, and Earnest Byner to found The Good Samaritan Foundation, a philanthropic organization sponsoring various community events in Washington, D.C. inner-city, community centers and homeless shelters. In July 2000 he was ordained into the ministry, and is currently serving as senior pastor at Bethel World Outreach Center in Brentwood, Tennessee.  In 2007, Johnson and his family moved to Orlando, Florida, to start the Orlando World Outreach Center church. Since then, he has reached over 10,000 people, once walking across Florida for three weeks.

Personal
He and his wife Le’Chelle currently live in Orlando, Florida, along with their three daughters, Christa, Kayla, Karrah and one son, Shaun. He is the pastor of Orlando World Outreach Center.

References

External links
Profiles of the Founders The Good Samaritan Foundation
Bethel World Outreach Center website
Orlando World Outreach Center website
Tim Johnson's Penn State Nittany Lions 1986 National Championship Football Pennant

1965 births
Living people
American football defensive linemen
Cincinnati Bengals players
Penn State Nittany Lions football players
Sportspeople from Sarasota, Florida
Pittsburgh Steelers players
Players of American football from Florida
Washington Redskins players